Justice Maxwell may refer to:

Augustus Maxwell (1820–1903), associate justice and chief justice of the Florida Supreme Court
Edwin Maxwell (attorney general) (1825-1903), associate justice of the Supreme Court of Appeals of West Virginia
Evelyn C. Maxwell (1863–1954), associate justice of the Florida Supreme Court
Ralph L. Maxwell (1905-1956), associate justice of the Supreme Court of Illinois
Haymond Maxwell (1879-1958), associate justice of the Supreme Court of Appeals of West Virginia